George Mahon may refer to:

 George H. Mahon (1900–1985), U.S. Representative from Texas
 George Mahon (Everton F.C. chairman) (1853–1908), former chairman of Everton Football Club